Discovery Family is an American cable television channel co-owned by Warner Bros. Discovery and Hasbro Entertainment.

The channel was originally launched by Discovery Communications on October 7, 1996 as Discovery Kids, a spin-off of Discovery Channel which primarily featured science and nature-themed programming aimed towards a youth audience. In 2010, Discovery Kids was relaunched as The Hub (later Hub Network) as part of a joint venture with Hasbro led by veteran executive Margaret Loesch. The relaunch pivoted the channel towards a general entertainment format, with dayparts targeting preschool, youth, and family audiences respectively. Some of its original programming would include adaptations of Hasbro-owned properties, such as Family Game Night and My Little Pony: Friendship is Magic.

In 2014, Loesch stepped down, and the network was rebranded as Discovery Family; at that time, Discovery began programming the channel's primetime schedule with family-oriented factual programming (including Discovery library programs), while leaving Hasbro responsible for programming its daytime schedule as a minority partner.

History

As Discovery Kids (1996–2010) 

Discovery Communications launched Discovery Kids Channel on October 7, 1996, as part of a suite of four new digital cable channels that included Discovery Travel & Living, Discovery Civilization, and Science Channel. Upon its launch, the network primarily offered adventure, nature, and science-themed programs aimed towards a children's audience between ages 6 and 11. Marjorie Kaplan, the network's senior vice president, explained that the creation of Discovery Kids was influenced primarily by kids, who were watching its parent network's programming together with their parents.

From 1996 to 2000, Discovery Kids was carried by only a select few cable television providers. In 2001, the channel was shortened to Discovery Kids and late in that year, it was carried in at least 15 million homes. In September 2001, a Canadian version of Discovery Kids was launched in partnership with Corus Entertainment.

In December 2001, Discovery Kids announced a partnership with NBC, in which it would produce a new Saturday morning block for the network known as Discovery Kids on NBC, beginning in September 2002. The block, which replaced a teen-oriented block consisting only of sitcoms, featured programming that met the U.S. Federal Communications Commission's (FCC) educational programming guidelines, including new original series (such as the reality television series Endurance), existing Discovery Kids programming, along with children's spin-offs of programs from sister networks, such as Animal Planet and Discovery Channel.

With the launch of the new block, Discovery Kids also branched out into animated programming with the premieres of Kenny the Shark and Tutenstein. In March 2006, Discovery declined to renew its contract with NBC for its Saturday morning block, citing a desire to focus exclusively on the Discovery Kids cable channel. Since the launch of the NBC block, Discovery Kids had grown its cable carriage to over 43 million homes. NBC would replace the Discovery Kids block with Qubo in September 2006.

As Hub Network (2010–2014)

Programming and development 
On April 30, 2009, toy manufacturer and multimedia company Hasbro announced that it would be forming a joint venture with Discovery Communications to relaunch Discovery Kids as a new family-oriented television channel, paying $300 million for 50% ownership of the network. Under the arrangement, Discovery would be in charge of handling advertising sales and distribution for the new service, while Hasbro would be involved in acquiring and producing programming. While educational series (including those carried over from Discovery Kids) were slated to be maintained on the schedule, plans called for new original programs based on Hasbro-owned franchises such as G.I. Joe, My Little Pony, Transformers and game shows adapted from its board game brands. Discovery Communications was looking for a business partner to draw the improved types of advertisers on the channel.

In July 2009, the joint venture appointed veteran television executive Margaret Loesch as its chief executive officer; prior to this, Loesch had led Fox Kids, and served as president and CEO of Marvel Productions from 1984 to 1990, assisting in the production of several Hasbro-based cartoons such as G.I. Joe: A Real American Hero, My Little Pony 'n Friends, and The Transformers.

In January 2010, Discovery and Hasbro announced that the new network would be known as The Hub; this was soon followed two months later with the announcement that The Hub would launch on October 10, 2010. The network's original imaging was developed by Troika Design Group and built around an emblem nicknamed the "hubble" – which was designed to embody a "catalyst of action and imagination". The final logo design was the result of a number of drafts by Troika designers, some of which had incorporated typography similar to Hasbro's logo.

Goals 
The relaunched channel, which would compete against established children services such as Cartoon Network, Disney Channel, and Nickelodeon, planned to continue targeting Discovery Kids' main demographic of children aged 2–12 (a market which staff felt was being abandoned by its competitors in favor of tweens) but also planned to feature a prime-time block with family-oriented programming; it was originally targeted at preteens and teenagers aged 9–14. Launch programming included the game show Family Game Night, animated television series Pound Puppies, My Little Pony: Friendship Is Magic – a new animated entry in the My Little Pony franchise developed by Lauren Faust, and Deltora Quest alongside reruns of the Jim Henson series Fraggle Rock and the preschool-oriented programs Animal Mechanicals and The WotWots. The channel promised to keep the proportion of programs supplied from Hasbro to "less than 20%" of the total of its programming.

Commercial programming 
The Children's Television Act (CTA) in the United States limits the commercial time during children's programming, and prohibits television broadcasters from airing advertisements for products associated with a program during or in timeslots adjacent to the show itself. During time slots that targeted preschool audiences (aired during a block branded as "HubBub"), The Hub was to broadcast six minutes of advertisements per hour, below 12 minutes per hour on weekdays, and 10.5 minutes per hour on weekends as mandated by the CTA. Additionally, it was planning to broadcast 10.5 minutes of advertisements per hour the rest of the day throughout the week, a policy upheld from its previous incarnation as Discovery Kids. The channel was planning to sell its advertising inventories to toy companies other than Hasbro as well; as reported by Advertising Age in May 2010, The Hub was even in talks with Mattel, one of Hasbro's major competitors in the toy industry. The channel, however, also planned to restrict certain categories of advertisements, including junk foods and "advertisers in the sugar category".

There have been reported concerns that the channel would be exploited by Hasbro as a platform to plug its products. Ahead of the channel's relaunch as The Hub, Campaign for a Commercial-Free Childhood (CCFC) called the whole project an "infomercial", and stated that they would be monitoring the channel. CCFC founder Susan Linn said "It will make a mockery of existing ad limits and the current prohibition of product placement in children's television" at the April 2009 announcement of the Discovery-Hasbro joint venture, and told Los Angeles Times that "[t]he notion of a toy company owning a television channel for the sole purpose of promoting their toys is egregious practice" in the days before the channel's relaunch. Loesch stated that The Hub's goal was to be "vibrant" and "diverse" in its programming, and that the channel would not purely be a marketing vehicle for Hasbro products. Loesch also said that Hasbro was partnering with Discovery Communications for the channel, and declared "we have programming from them and are using their DNA".

Launch and later years 
To promote The Hub, sneak peeks of Cosmic Quantum Ray, The Twisted Whiskers Show, and Family Game Night aired on Science Channel, Animal Planet, and TLC respectively. Discovery Kids' relaunch as The Hub was preceded by a marathon of Kenny the Shark (broadcast under the @DK block), running from 6:00 to 10:00 a.m. ET. Immediately after, The Hub premiered with "Sneak Peak Sunday", a sampler lineup of programs set to air on the channel in the coming months. The Twisted Whiskers Show was the first program to air of the channel, followed by episodes of Dennis and Gnasher, Cosmic Quantum Ray, Atomic Betty, and the network premiere of the 2004 film Garfield: The Movie.

In a June 2011 debt filing with the Securities and Exchange Commission, Discovery Communications indicated that the channel may be worth less than recently believed, based on low viewership figures. The management of The Hub subsequently underwent a fair value analysis of the channel. A Discovery Communications spokesperson considered the action to be "a pro-forma accounting exercise", and noted that Discovery felt "very positive and encouraged by The Hub's early days' performance, and ability to grow its audience in the future."

In March 2013, The Hub picked up Stan Lee's Mighty 7, an animated pilot film that aired on February 1, 2014. The network also began to phase in an amended branding as the Hub Network. On January 13, 2014, Hub Network introduced an updated logo, along with a new imaging campaign, "Making Family Fun", which was developed by the Los Angeles-based agency Oishii Creative.

As Discovery Family (2014–present) 
On June 12, 2014, it was reported that Margaret Loesch would step down from her role as Hub Network president and CEO by the end of the year. On September 17, 2014, The Wall Street Journal reported that Discovery Communications was preparing to acquire a controlling stake in Hub Network from Hasbro and then retool it as Discovery Family. Along with Discovery's CFO Andrew Warren, Hasbro staff acknowledged that increasing competition in the children's media landscape – especially by subscription video-on-demand services such as Netflix – had an effect on the overall performance of the network and Hasbro's original content. As it was majority-owned by a competitor, other major toy companies such as Mattel refused to purchase advertising time on Hub Network, affecting its ability to air advertising that targeted its main audience; by 2014, the network had made only $9 million per year. Discovery staff was also unable to display a full commitment to Hub Network's operation, due to factors such as the troubled launch of the Oprah Winfrey Network. Believing that they had overvalued its stake in the venture, Hasbro decided to cede the operation of the network to Discovery so it could focus more on content, and its core toy business.

Discovery and Hasbro publicly announced the planned rebranding on September 25, 2014, Hasbro's CEO Brian Goldner explained that Discovery Family would be the "next chapter" in its joint venture with Discovery, "[combining] highly rated award-winning storytelling around Hasbro's brands and Discovery's most popular non-fiction shows that appeal to both children and families alike." Following reports earlier in the year that Hub Network president Margaret Loesch would step down by the end of the year, Discovery acquired 10% of Hasbro's stake in the network, and Henry Schleiff replaced Loesch, who leads sister networks such as Destination America and Investigation Discovery.

Hub Network was re-launched as Discovery Family on October 13, 2014 – just over four years since the original launch of The Hub. With these changes, Discovery Communications now held a 60% stake in the joint venture; Hasbro continued to hold a 40% stake in Discovery Family, and continued to program the network's daytime lineup with children's programming. Following the re-launch, the network's primetime lineup was replaced by reruns of family-oriented non-fiction programming from Discovery Channel's library. Henry Schleiff, who leads sister networks such as Destination America and Investigation Discovery, leads the re-launched network, with Tom Cosgrove (who previously served as CEO of Discovery Channel and Science) as general manager.

In re-launching Hub Network, Discovery executives noted that there would be a larger emphasis on programming of interest to both children and their parents; Warren argued that since ABC Family had become, in his opinion, aimed towards teenage girls, there was a gap in the broadcasting industry for a new, family-oriented network. With these shifts in the network's operation, it was announced on October 7, 2014 that the Transformers: Prime follow-up Transformers: Robots in Disguise–which was originally announced for Hub Network–would instead be picked up by Cartoon Network. Hasbro Studios president Stephen Davis felt that Cartoon Network was a more appropriate home for a Transformers series due to its male-oriented demographics, describing Hub Network's lineup as being "traditionally skewed towards girls".  Other recent Transformers animated series preceding the original launch of The Hub also aired on Cartoon Network. Davis remarked that Hasbro was still "100% committed" to its joint venture with Discovery. Despite the move for Robots in Disguise, fellow Hub Network Transformers series Transformers: Rescue Bots remained on Discovery Family for its third season.

Warner Bros. Discovery era, future of Hasbro ownership 
On February 7, 2022, Hasbro CFO Deborah Thomas stated that the company was exploring strategic alternatives for its stake in the channel, citing the growing shift towards cord cutting and streaming services. She noted that the channel had been a "terrific investment" that had "driven over a $1 billion in revenue for the company", but that there had been "changes" in the cable industry since. These discussions came ahead of the then-upcoming merger of Discovery Inc. with WarnerMedia to form Warner Bros. Discovery, a transaction which brought Discovery Family into the Entertainment Group division of Warner Bros. Discovery Networks. Following the merger, Discovery Family was placed under the oversight of Cartoon Network's president Michael Ouweleen.

The channel's TV Everywhere app, Discovery Family Go, was discontinued on May 2, 2022. Its closure was only given about a week's warning. In August 2022, Bloomberg reported that Hasbro was considering selling or restructuring its entertainment assets (such as eOne). On September 24, 2022, the network's website was restructured to match its new look as a webpage on the Discovery website.

As of February 22, 2023, Hasbro and Discovery's contract is currently extended to March 31, 2025.

Programming 

The majority of Discovery Family's daytime programs are animated and live-action series tied to media franchises owned by Hasbro itself, with newer series produced through the Hasbro Studios and Entertainment One divisions, such as Pound Puppies and Transformers: Rescue Bots. As the Hub Network, it also previously aired game shows tied to Hasbro's board games, such as Family Game Night.

One of the network's most noteworthy series has been My Little Pony: Friendship Is Magic, an animated series produced as a part of the then-recent revival of Hasbro's My Little Pony franchise. The series not only became The Hub's highest-rated program within its target demographic of young girls, but attracted an unexpectedly significant cult following among male teens and adults. Following the conclusion of the series on October 12, 2019, the animated spin-off series featuring its cast, My Little Pony: Pony Life, premiered on Discovery Family on November 7, 2020.

The Hatchery – a company co-founded by Margaret Loesch (who served as the channel's president and CEO from 2009 to 2014) and Bruce Stein in 2003, and had a majority stake acquired by American Greetings in 2004 – has supplied certain series to the channel, including Dan Vs. and R. L. Stine's The Haunting Hour. Aside from The Hatchery's productions, American Greetings also supplied Strawberry Shortcake's Berry Bitty Adventures (part of the 2009 relaunch of Strawberry Shortcake, a property which was owned by AG until 2015), The Twisted Whiskers Show, Maryoku Yummy, and Care Bears: Welcome to Care-a-Lot to the channel. Hasbro was named the master toy licensee of Care Bears and Strawberry Shortcake in 2008.

The channel has also acquired new series unrelated to properties of Hasbro, The Hatchery and American Greetings, including Animal Mechanicals, The Aquabats! Super Show!, Cosmic Quantum Ray, Majors & Minors, Sabrina: Secrets of a Teenage Witch, Secret Millionaires Club, and SheZow.

During its years as the Hub Network, the channel also aired reruns of other acquired series, such as Fraggle Rock and Lois & Clark: The New Adventures of Superman, a collection of various Warner Bros. Animation series, such as Batman Beyond, Batman: The Animated Series, Superman: The Animated Series, Animaniacs, and Tiny Toon Adventures, a few former Fox Kids shows such as Goosebumps and Ninja Turtles: The Next Mutation, and various off-network sitcoms (at the end of the Hub Network's run, these included Blossom, Step by Step, and Sister, Sister); Blossom, the only sitcom on Discovery Family's schedule, returned for a time in 2016. A limited amount of original Discovery Kids programming, such as Adventure Camp and Flight 29 Down, remained on the lineup upon its launch as The Hub.

Primetime and overnight programming 
Following the relaunch as Discovery Family in October 2014, Discovery began programming the channel's primetime schedule with family-oriented factual programming (including Discovery library programs), while leaving Hasbro responsible for programming its daytime schedule as a minority partner.

The original programs commissioned for the channel in this timeslot include Bake It Like Buddy, From Wags to Riches with Bill Berloni, My Dog's Crazy Animal Friends, Reno, Set, Go!, Secrets of America's Favorite Places and burn-off the remaining episodes of season 9 of Cake Boss.

Availability 
As of September 2018, approximately 55,238,000 American households (50.9% of households with television) receive Discovery Family.

Discovery Family operates one feed nationally, and does not operate a timeshift feed for the west coast. A 1080i high-definition simulcast of the network was introduced alongside its re-launch as The Hub, with Dish Network, Verizon FiOS, and AT&T U-verse as the first to carry the HD feed.

Based on numbers from Nielsen, Variety ranked Discovery Family as the 132nd most-watched broadcast or cable network in the United States in 2022 based on total viewership.

International versions 

On March 31, 2016, the pan-EMEA version of Discovery World was re-launched as a regional version of Discovery Family. On September 14, 2017, a French version of Discovery Family was launched in France, until its shutdown on March 29, 2022.

The pan-EMEA and French versions of Discovery Family never carried kid-oriented shows, as those supplying such programs to Discovery Family in the United States (including Hasbro) had pre-existing deals with other international networks.

See also 
 Discovery Familia: The domestic Spanish-language equivalent in the United States with a similar scheduling strategy.
 K2: Italian equivalent in the United States with a similar scheduling strategy.
 Frisbee: Italian sister network to K2.

References

External links 
 

Discovery Kids
Children's television networks in the United States
English-language television stations in the United States
Hasbro subsidiaries
Joint ventures
Television channels and stations established in 1996
Television networks in the United States
Television programming blocks
Warner Bros. Discovery networks